Bai Mariam Sangki-Mangudadatu is a Filipina politician from the province of Maguindanao, Philippines. She currently serves as Governor of the province. She was first elected as governor in 2019 and known as the first woman governor of Maguindanao.

Her province was dissolved following the 2022 Maguindanao division plebiscite on September 17, 2022, and she was supposed to become acting governor of the new Maguindanao del Sur province. However this was uncertain, since the relevant provision presumes that the plebiscite would be held before the May 2022 national elections but the division vote was postponed after that date. She assumed the position and took her oath as governor of the new province on October 13.

Notes

References

External links
Province of Maguindanao

Living people
Governors of Maguindanao del Sur
Governors of Maguindanao
Governors of former provinces of the Philippines
PDP–Laban politicians
Year of birth missing (living people)
Filipino Muslims
People from Maguindanao